Karin Svingstedt (born 13 November 1964) is a Swedish cross-country skier. She competed in two events at the 1988 Winter Olympics.

Cross-country skiing results
All results are sourced from the International Ski Federation (FIS).

Olympic Games

World Championships

World Cup

Season standings

Team podiums

 1 podium

References

External links
 

1964 births
Living people
Swedish female cross-country skiers
Olympic cross-country skiers of Sweden
Cross-country skiers at the 1988 Winter Olympics
People from Nordanstig Municipality
20th-century Swedish women